Ismo Olavi Hölttö (born 12 February 1940 in Espoo) is a Finnish documentary photographer known for his monochrome portraits of Romani people and others living in the cities and countryside of Finland in the 1960s, a time of rapid societal change.

Life and career
Hölttö was born in 1940. In 1955, he started as an apprentice goldsmith with the Helsinki firm of G. Buchert. He studied at the School of Applied Arts, whose vocational evening courses were held in the Ateneum museum building. From then until 1970 he worked at the firm of Westerback; he left after winning the State Photography Prize and set up an advertising company, Rykämä. The photography for which he is known was almost complete by this point: thereafter, his professional photography left little time for him to pursue his own photographic interests.

Hölttö became interested in photography via two colleagues in the jewelry shop where he worked. After initial attempts at landscape, Hölttö found his métier: portraiture. He pursued this vigorously, seldom photographing anything else.

In summer 1966 Hölttö and Savolainen visited Northern Karelia. They had had light-hearted intentions but found the trip unexpectedly worthwhile, and pursued the work during the coming years. In 1970, Savolainen arranged their work into the photobook , published in time for Christmas. Hölttö's portraiture was complemented by Savolainen's concentration on communities.

Soon after becoming seriously interested in photography, Hölttö bought a Rolleiflex medium format twin lens reflex camera, whose design encouraged or even enforced a certain deliberation. From 1968, he added a 35 mm camera; but for the majority of his better-known portraits, his technique was somewhat similar to that of a studio photographer.

Such an extensive series of portraits was unprecedented for Finland, and Hölttö's work has sometimes been compared with August Sander's  (English as ). But whereas Sander had followed a self-imposed assignment of photographing people having a list of occupations, Hölttö photographed as he wished.

Hölttö's photography in Northern Karelia concentrated on smallholders and others on the lower rungs of society, but his coverage in Helsinki was broader, showing middle-class people and even hippies.

Using a Rolleiflex, he photographed both Helsinki and the Finnish countryside: North Karelia, Savonia and Oulu. He shot the main body of his work during the ten years between 1962 and 1971 while working as a goldsmith. When he started documenting the Finnish people, he was only 22; when he ended this series he had turned 31.

The reproductions of Hölttö's negatives have changed considerably over time. In the 1960s he favoured high contrast, close cropping, and glossy paper. The early books used duotone offset printing, with little or no space separating the images. His large 1989 book  (English edition in 1991 as People in the Lead Role) used tritone printing for reduced and subtler contrast, with more relaxed cropping.

His works have been exhibited in Finland, Russia, Denmark, France and Lithuania.

Books of Hölttö's works
 and Ismo Hölttö (photographs),  (text). Suomea tämäkin. (This too is Finland.) Jyväskylä: Gummerus, 1970. In Finnish.
Kari Huttunen (text), Ismo Hölttö and Mikko Savolainen (photographs). Raportti suomen mustalaisista. (A report on the Roma of Finland.) Jyvaskylassa: K. J. Gummerus Osakeyhtion, 1972. . In Finnish.
Mikko Savolainen (text and photographs) and Ismo Hölttö (photographs). Vanhuksia. (The Elderly.) [Ilomantsi: M. Savolainen], 1982. . In Finnish.
Ismo Hölttö. Ihminen pääosassa. Kuvia suomalaisista. Helsinki: Ismo Hölttö, 1989. . In Finnish.
Ismo Hölttö. People in the Lead Role: Photographs of Finns. Helsinki: Ismo Hölttö, 1991. . In English.
Ismo Hölttö. Pieniä Ihmisiä. Helsinki: Erweko Painotuote, 2002. . In Finnish.
Ismo Hölttö. Valokuvia = Photographs. Helsinki: Finnish Museum of Photography, 2008. With an essay by Elina Heikka in Finnish and English. The book uses plates made for Ihminen pääosassa (1989).
Liisa Lindgren (text) and Ismo Hölttö (photographs). Taidetta Pikkuparlamentissa: Puun kansasta Menneisiin ritareihin. [Helsinki]: [Eduskunta], 2008. . In Finnish. About works of art in the Finnish Parliament Annex.
Konst i Lilla Parlamentet: från Xylotek till Smultronstället. [Helsinki]: [Riksdagen], 2008. . Swedish translation.
Art in the Little Parliament: From Wood People to Past Knights. [Helsinki]: [Eduskunta], 2008. . English translation.

Notes

References

External links
 (holtto.com)
Photographs by Hölttö, Young Gallery. Retrieved by the Wayback Machine on 6 April 2016.
 Hester Keijser, "Portrait therapy: Ismo Hölttö", Mrs Deane, 27 April 2009. Keijser discusses variation in prints from the same negatives, in particular whether or not they are cropped.

1940 births
Finnish photographers
Portrait photographers
Living people